Mano Po 7: Chinoy is a 2016 Filipino drama film directed by Ian Loreños, and the seventh installment of the Mano Po film series. The film starring Richard Yap, Jean Garcia and Enchong Dee. The film was produced by Regal Entertainment. It tells the story of a modern Chinese Filipino family. Beneath the facade of a typical well-off Chinese Filipino family, it also tackles the struggles of family life as well as how they managed to reunite themselves as one. The film was shown in theatres starting December 14, 2016, but was delayed due to insistent public demand that the film was re-run in theatres starting February 8, 2017. The film starred Richard Yap, making him the first male main protagonist in the Mano Po film series. It was also the second Mano Po film that was not directed by Joel Lamangan who directed Mano Po, Mano Po III: My Love, Mano Po 4: Ako Legal Wife, Mano Po 5: Gua Ai Di and Mano Po 6: A Mother's Love.

Plot 
Wilson and Debbie's wedding anniversary is interrupted by the antics of their problematic son Wilson "Son" Jr., a drug and alcohol addict. Fed up, Wilson sends his son to a rehab facility, where the latter falls in love with a fellow patient, Jocelyn. After graduating, Son and Jocelyn get engaged but the latter dies of an overdose while searching for Son at a bar. Meanwhile, Debbie begins an affair at her jewelry shop with a customer named Marco but later calls it off. Incensed Marco comes to Wong residence and starts a disturbance, leading to Wilson's discovery of the affair and his estrangement with Debbie. Their daughter, Catherine, begins music school but is rescued by a classmate from a maniac professor, leading her to shift courses. Wilson also deals with the return of his estranged homosexual brother Jason and caring for their elderly mother Erlinda. Son (after Jocelyn's funeral) and Catherine separately urge their father to reconcile with Debbie, which he does. Wilson allows Jason to reconnect with their mother, finally setting his family at peace.

Cast

 Richard Yap as Wilson Wong
 Marlo Mortel as Henry Santos 
 Jean Garcia as Deborah "Debbie" Lim-Wong
 Janella Salvador as Caroline "Carol" Wong
 Enchong Dee as Wilson "Son" Wong, Jr.
 Jessy Mendiola as Jocelyn C. Lee
 Jana Agoncillo as Catherine Wong
 Kean Cipriano as Denver Vera 
 David Chua as young Manuel U. Wong 
 Rebecca Chuanunsu as Erlinda Wong 
 Eric Quizon as Jason Wong
 Jake Cuenca as Marco
 Pinky Amador as Jocelyn's mother
 Rosalind Wee as Auntie Rosa

Box office
Together with Star Cinema's The Super Parental Guardians and OctoArts Films, M-Zet Productions & APT Entertainment's Enteng Kabisote 10 and the Abangers, Mano Po 7: Chinoy failed to make it into the Magic 8 of the 2016 Metro Manila Film Festival. It was shown on December 14, 2016, and was shown in almost 200 cinemas nationwide. The movie earned a decent  on its opening day. It earned  on its entire run.

See also
Mano Po (Filipino film series)
Mano Po
Mano Po 2
Mano Po III: My Love
Ako Legal Wife
Mano Po 5: Gua Ai Di
Bahay Kubo: A Pinoy Mano Po!
Mano Po 6: A Mother's Love

References

External links
 Official Trailer on YouTube

Philippine drama films
Regal Entertainment films
Films about families
Films directed by Ian Loreños